Tản Viên Sơn Thánh (Chữ Hán: 傘圓山聖, 304 BCE - ?), or  Sơn Tinh (山精) is one of The Four Immortals in traditional Vietnamese mythology. He is the god of Ba Vì mountain range and figures also in the romance of Sơn Tinh - Thủy Tinh ("the God of the Mountain and the God of the Water"). 

Temples are dedicated to him in most towns, for example the Và Temple in Sơn Tây, Hanoi.

References

Vietnamese mythology
Vietnamese gods
Vietnamese culture heroes
Vietnamese deities
Mountain gods